Saidu Medical College is a Public Sector Medical Institute located in Saidu Sharif, Swat District, Khyber Pakhtunkhwa, Pakistan. It is one of several medical colleges affiliated with Khyber Medical University.

History

The first batch started in December 1998 with enrollment of 50 students in MBBS Programme.
Initially, Saidu Medical College was affiliated with University of Peshawar, but now it is affiliated with Khyber Medical University. The Medical College is adjacent to Saidu Teaching Hospital. Till now, more than 1,000 students have graduated from the institution.

Teaching Hospital 
Saidu Teaching Hospital, Saidu Sharif, Swat is declared as Teaching Hospital of Saidu Medical College Swat, Vide Notification No. SOH-II/2-58/2000/PMDC, dated September 25, 2000.

Admissions
Saidu Medical College currently enrolls 100 students every year in MBBS Programme.

Departments

Basic Sciences
 Anatomy
 Physiology
 Biochemistry
 Pharmacology 
 Pathology 
 Forensic Medicine 
 Community Medicine
 Medical Education

Clinical Sciences
 Medicine
 Surgery
 Gynaecology
 Paediatrics
 Ophthalmology
 ENT
 Radiology
 Anesthesia
 Paediatrics Surgery
 Plastic Surgery
 Nephrology
 Orthopedics
 Cardiology
 Pulmonology
 Dermatology
 Psychiatry
Gastroenterology

Societies
 Social Welfare Society: The main objective of SWS of SMC is to give financial support to poor patients, arranging free medical camps in remote areas of Khyber Pakhtunkhwa (including FATA) and to promote public awareness about serious social problems like smoking, AIDS, Drugs and Narcotics.
 Public Health Society: The purpose of Public Health Society in SMC is to play a significant role in preventing health related issues like AIDS/HIV, Hepatitis, Polio, Tuberculosis, Population, Nutrition Program, Bird Flu etc.
 Literary Society: To enhance Literary interest of the students.
 Sports Society: This society is responsible for conducting annual sports day each year. It organizes sports week for inter-class tournament each year.

Events
Many events are organized by the various societies of the college. The literary society arranges Literary Week, Sports Week, Fun Fair and Crazy Week. Mega Events, Blood Camps, Medical Camps and recreational tours are arranged by other societies like the Bacha Khan Welfare Society.

Literary Work
'First Aid & Patient Safety' a widely studied book on emergency first aid throughout the South Asian region is a publication by one of the students of Saidu Medical College, Swat.

See also 
 Khyber Medical College
 Khyber Medical University
 Ayub Medical College
 List of medical schools in Pakistan

External links
 Kgmc.edu.pk
 Pmdc.org.pk
 Imed.faimer.org

1998 establishments in Pakistan
Educational institutions established in 1998
Khyber Medical University
Medical colleges in Khyber Pakhtunkhwa
Public universities and colleges in Khyber Pakhtunkhwa
Swat District